Ariel Zuckermann (born in 1973 in Tel Aviv) is an Israeli conductor, since 2015 director and conductor of the Israel Chamber Orchestra.

Career 

Ariel Zuckermann began his musical career as flautist. A student of Paul Meisen and András Adorján, he also took master courses with Alain Marion and Aurèle Nicolet. Winner of a number of renowned international competitions, he played under conductors such as Lorin Maazel, Daniel Barenboim, Zubin Mehta and Riccardo Muti in orchestras such as the Symphony Orchestra of the Bavarian Radio, Munich Philharmonic, Israel Philharmonic Orchestra and Bavarian State Opera. Since 2002 he has been soloist of Kolsimcha - The World Quintet, an ensemble which has recorded extensively and performs worldwide.

Ariel Zuckermann studied orchestral conducting with Jorma Panula at the Royal College of Music, Stockholm. In May 2004 he graduated from Munich's Musikhochschule as conducting student of Bruno Weil and shortly afterwards was appointed Music Director of the Georgian Chamber Orchestra.

In 2003/2004, was appointed Assistant Conductor to Iván Fischer with the Budapest Festival Orchestra where he acquired a large repertoire and conducted many performances.

Further conducting engagements include concerts and recordings with the Israel Philharmonic Orchestra, Basel and Lucerne Symphony orchestras, Bavarian State Opera, KBS Radio Orchestra Seoul, Belgrade Philharmonic, Hungarian National Philharmonic, Munich Bach Collegium, Bremen Philharmonic as well as Rheinland-Pfalz State Philharmonic.

In November 2007, he made his debut with the Deutsches Symphonie-Orchester Berlin at Berlin's Philharmonie. Engagements in 2008/09 lead him to the WDR Symphony Orchestra in Cologne, Munich Radio Orchestra, Vienna Chamber Orchestra, Prague Philharmonic and see return visits to the Hungarian National and Bremen Philharmonics.

References

External links
Official website
Ariel Zuckermann's recording at ArkivMusic.com.
Site of the orchestra Israeli Camerata Jerusalem 2011–2012 (Hebrew)

1973 births
Living people
Israeli conductors (music)
Israeli classical flautists
Royal College of Music, Stockholm alumni
21st-century conductors (music)
21st-century flautists